Carlos de los Cobos Martínez (born 10 December 1958) is a Mexican former professional football player and manager who last managed El Salvador.

Playing career
As a player, de los Cobos spent the majority of his playing career in his native Mexico, playing for both Querétaro and Monterrey on numerous occasions. He represented his country at the 1986 Football World Cup held in Mexico, where he was an integral part of the team's quarter-final run. He share team with Héctor Miguel Zelada, "El Vasco" Aguirre, Alfredo Tena, Cristóbal Ortega.

Coaching career
As a coach, he has been in charge at Club América, Querétaro, Club Celaya, and Deportivo Irapuato. He served as an assistant coach to Manuel Lapuente and the Mexico national team at the 1998 Football World Cup, as well as the 1996 Olympic Games. In 2002, Mexico national team manager Ricardo La Volpe designated him as the U23 national team coach, participating in 2002 Central American and Caribbean Games held in San Salvador, El Salvador. Mexico was defeated in the final by El Salvador.

On 26 August 2006 De Los Cobos was appointed coach of the El Salvador national football team. He coached his first international tournament in the 2007 CONCACAF Gold Cup. El Salvador shared group with defending Gold Cup champions United States, Guatemala and Trinidad and Tobago. After two losses and 1 win, El Salvador and Trinidad and Tobago failed to advanced to quarter-finals.

In the first round of the 2010 FIFA World Cup qualification, El Salvador eliminated Anguilla with a 16–0 on aggregate and advanced to play in the Second Round against Panama and eliminated "Los Canaleros" by an aggregate score and advanced to the Third Round. He then managed to advance El Salvador to the Hexagonal which is the final qualifying round for CONCACAF. El Salvador had not qualified to the Hexagonal since the 1998 World Cup qualifying. On 14 December 2009, De los Cobos announced he would not continue as the manager of El Salvador after the end of his contract. He mentioned that one of his reasons for not renewing his contract was due to him no longer being motivated to continue on with the national team.

On 8 January 2010, it was declared that Carlos de los Cobos was the new coach for the Chicago Fire. Having missed the playoffs for just the second time in club history in 2010 and sitting near the bottom of the league with a 1–4–6 record, De Los Cobos was dismissed on 30 May 2011 and replaced by Frank Klopas.

Personal
De los Cobos and his wife Mayte have two children: Rafael and Paulina.

Honours
América
Mexican Primera División: 1983–84, 1987–88, 1988–89
Campeón de Campeones: 1988

References

External links

1958 births
Living people
People from Matamoros, Tamaulipas
Footballers from Tamaulipas
Association football midfielders
Mexico international footballers
1986 FIFA World Cup players
Querétaro F.C. footballers
Club América footballers
Club Necaxa footballers
C.F. Monterrey players
Liga MX players
Mexican football managers
Querétaro F.C. managers
Tigres UANL managers
Club América managers
Irapuato F.C. managers
C.D. FAS managers
El Salvador national football team managers
Chicago Fire FC coaches
Mexican expatriate football managers
Expatriate football managers in El Salvador
Mexican expatriate sportspeople in El Salvador
Expatriate soccer managers in the United States
Mexican expatriate sportspeople in the United States
Major League Soccer coaches
2019 CONCACAF Gold Cup managers
Mexican footballers